Strike Force: Cobra is a video game published in the United Kingdom by Piranha Software for the Commodore 64, Amstrad CPC and ZX Spectrum home computers. It was subsequently released in the United States by Spinnaker Software.

Plot
The world's top computer scientists have been kidnapped and forced to work for The Enemy. They have developed a system that will let The Enemy control the worlds nuclear weapons. Strike force must infiltrate his hideout, crack the computer codes, and rescue the scientists. The scientists will give a number when rescued that will help break the code using the DBL (Digital Lock Breaker).

References

1986 video games
Commodore 64 games
Commodore 128 games
Amstrad CPC games
Strategy video games
Video games developed in the United Kingdom
ZX Spectrum games
Spinnaker Software games
Piranha Software games